Osséja is a railway station in Osséja, Occitanie, France. The station is on the Ligne de Cerdagne. The line is a narrow gauge line at 1,000 mm (3 ft 3 3⁄8 in) and has a third rail pickup at 750 V DC (3rd Rail). Osséja is the southernmost station on the French mainland. The station is served by TER Occitanie (local) trains (known as Train Jaune) operated by the SNCF.

Train services
The following services currently call at Osséja:
local service (TER Occitanie) Latour-de-Carol-Enveitg–Font-Romeu–Villefranche-Vernet-les-Bains

References

External links
 https://www.flickr.com/photos/ut440_131m/5459905626/

Railway stations in Pyrénées-Orientales